Belux Bukasa Kasongo (born 13 August 1979) is a retired Congolese footballer. After his playing career, Belux became a coach while completing his CAF D licence. He is currently coaching at the AmaZulu Academy.

References

1979 births
Living people
Democratic Republic of the Congo footballers
Democratic Republic of the Congo international footballers
Association football midfielders
People from Kananga
AS Vita Club players
FC SKA Rostov-on-Don players
Platinum Stars F.C. players
AmaZulu F.C. players
Belux Bukasa Kasongo
Democratic Republic of the Congo expatriate footballers
Expatriate footballers in Russia
Democratic Republic of the Congo expatriate sportspeople in Russia
Expatriate soccer players in South Africa
Democratic Republic of the Congo expatriate sportspeople in South Africa
Expatriate footballers in Thailand
Democratic Republic of the Congo expatriate sportspeople in Thailand
21st-century Democratic Republic of the Congo people
2002 African Cup of Nations players